Kristina Vestveit (born 24 August 1986) is a Norwegian rifle shooter. She was selected to represent Norway during the 2008 Summer Olympics in Beijing. The Norwegian Shooting Federation had suggested to select Ingrid Stubsjøen, but Olympiatoppen selected Vestveit instead after good performances in the final World Cup event of the 2008 season.

Vestveit received her first international senior medal when she was only 18 years old, when she won the bronze medal in the 300 m Rifle Three Positions event during the European Championships in Belgrade 2005. A year later she became junior World Champion in 50 m Rifle Three Positions during the 2006 ISSF World Shooting Championships in Zagreb.

References

1986 births
Living people
Norwegian female sport shooters
ISSF rifle shooters
Shooters at the 2008 Summer Olympics
Olympic shooters of Norway
21st-century Norwegian women